The Moonraker is a historical play by the British writer Arthur Watkyn. It premiered at the Cambridge Arts Theatre and in June 1952 had a brief run at the Saville Theatre in London's West End. The cast included Jean Kent, Griffith Jones, Henry Oscar, Paul Whitsun-Jones, William Moore and Julian Somers. It was directed by Terence De Marney.

Film adaptation
The film rights were quickly acquired by Associated British, but a plan to produce it with Audrey Hepburn fell through and the project was put on hold for several years. In 1958 the studio produced The Moonraker directed by David MacDonald and starring George Baker, Sylvia Syms and Marius Goring.

References

Bibliography
 Goble, Alan. The Complete Index to Literary Sources in Film. Walter de Gruyter, 1999.
 Wearing, J.P. The London Stage 1950-1959: A Calendar of Productions, Performers, and Personnel.  Rowman & Littlefield, 2014.

1952 plays
British plays
West End plays
Historical plays
Plays set in Devon
Plays set in the 17th century
British plays adapted into films
Plays by Arthur Watkyn